A motion of no confidence in the Spanish government of Pedro Sánchez was tabled by the far-right party Vox on 27 February 2023, and will be debated and voted in the Congress of Deputies between 21 and 22 March 2023. It will be the sixth motion of no confidence in Spain since the country's transition to democracy.

Vox announced the motion of no confidence on 9 December 2022, proposing it to be tabled under an independent candidate with government experience, voicing that Sánchez's proposed reforms of the criminal code to modify the embezzlement and sedition crimes were akin to a "self-coup" similar to "that of Pedro Castillo in Peru" two days earlier. The opposition People's Party (PP) under Alberto Núñez Feijóo stated that it would not vote against the motion, unlike the 2020 vote, but it did not clarify whether it would abstain or vote in favour of it depending on the proposed candidate.

After a period in which Vox was unable to get the consent of any of the candidates it reached out for, on 1 February 2023 the party proposed economist and former politician Ramón Tamames, aged 89, to lead the motion. Tamames accepted on 21 February, with the motion's registration being announced for the next Monday.

Legal provisions
The Spanish Constitution of 1978 required for motions of no confidence to be proposed by at least one-tenth of the Congress of Deputies—35 out of 350. Following the German model, votes of no confidence in Spain were constructive, so the motion was required to include an alternative candidate for prime minister. For a motion of no confidence to be successful, it had to be passed by an absolute majority in the Congress of Deputies. A minimum period of five days from the motion's registration (dubbed as "cooling period") was required to pass before it could come up for a vote, but no maximum was established. Other parties were entitled to submit alternative motions within the first two days from the registration.

Concurrently, the Prime Minister was barred from dissolving the Cortes Generales and calling a general election while a motion of no confidence was pending. If the motion was successful, the incumbent prime minister and their government were required to submit their resignation to the Monarch, while the candidate proposed in the motion was automatically considered to have the confidence of the Congress of Deputies and immediately appointed as prime minister. If unsuccessful, the signatories of the motion were barred from submitting another during the same session.

The procedure for motions of no confidence was regulated within Articles 175 to 179 of the Standing Orders of the Congress of Deputies, which provided for the debate on the motion starting with its defence by one of the signatory members without any time limitations, to be followed by an also time-unlimited speech by the nominated candidate to explain their political programme. Subsequently, spokespeople from the different parliamentary groups in Congress were allowed to speak for thirty minutes, with an opportunity to reply or rectify themselves for ten minutes. Members of the government were allowed to take the floor and speak at any time of their request during the debate.

Opinion polls
Opinion polling conducted in the days during and after the events of the vote of no confidence showed a large opposition to the motion.

Events

Party positions

After Vox announced that it would table a second motion of no confidence after the one they previously presented in 2020, the various parties announced their stances to the motion. Aside of the governing parties—the Spanish Socialist Workers' Party (PSOE) and Unidas Podemos—and barring any major position change, it is expected to meet with the opposition of Republican Left of Catalonia (ERC), the Basque Nationalist Party (PNV), EH Bildu, Together for Catalonia (JxCat), the Catalan European Democratic Party (PDeCAT), Más País, Commitment Coalition (Compromís), New Canaries (NCa), the Galician Nationalist Bloc (BNG) and Teruel Existe (TE). On December 2022, the leader of the Regionalist Party of Cantabria (PRC), Miguel Ángel Revilla, announced that his party would not support a motion of no confidence on Sánchez's government. Citizens (CS) also announced its "No" vote to the motion, branding it as "useless as an option to guarantee progress, freedom and equality" of the Spaniards"

The leader of the People's Party (PP), Alberto Núñez Feijóo, announced that the party would not vote against it—as it did in 2020—and would abstain instead.

Vote

References

2023 in Madrid
2023 in politics
Votes of no confidence in Spain